The Kirov Academy of Ballet (formerly the Universal Ballet Academy) was a ballet school in Washington, D.C. It was founded in 1989. It closed in May 2022 due to financial issues.

Facilities 
The Kirov is located on a 1.2 acre campus in northeast Washington, D.C., near The Catholic University of America. The 50,000 square foot gated facility features dormitories, four rehearsal studios and a flexible multipurpose space, 300-seat theatre, classrooms, computer lab, full kitchen and cafeteria, dance library, recreation room, exercise room and locker rooms with hot tubs.

Performance series 
The Kirov’s spring and winter performance series are held in the academy’s 300-seat auditorium. Annually, the six performances serve more 1,800 people, including student performers, family members, children (including from underserved populations), and ballet aficionados of all ages.

Notable students 
The Kirov’s most notable accomplishment is its ongoing ability to train ballet dancers, who have gone on to perform with such professional companies as American Ballet Theatre, The Royal Ballet, Stuttgart Ballet, and the San Francisco Ballet, to name a few.

Graduates and other students of The Kirov Academy of Ballet include Sascha Radetsky, Jayna Ledford, Rasta Thomas, Hee Seo, Michele Wiles, Danny Tidwell, Tyler Nelson, Vanessa Zahorian, Sasha De Sola, Brooklyn Mack, Melissa Hough, Amanda Kate Eddleman and Maria Bystrova.

References

See also
Kirov Ballet

Ballet schools in the United States
Russian-American culture in Washington, D.C.
Private high schools in Washington, D.C.
Private elementary schools in Washington, D.C.
Private middle schools in Washington, D.C.
Dance in Washington, D.C.
Educational institutions established in 1989
1989 establishments in Washington, D.C.
Northeast (Washington, D.C.)